Lieutenant Colonel Philip Eric Bent  (3 January 1891 – 1 October 1917) was a Canadian British Army officer recipient of the Victoria Cross, the highest and most prestigious award for gallantry in the face of the enemy that can be awarded to British and Commonwealth forces.

Biography
Bent was born on 3 January 1891 in Halifax, Nova Scotia and was educated at the Royal High School, Edinburgh and Ashby Grammar School, Ashby de la Zouch. He joined the training ship  in 1907. He served two years as a Cadet and then went to sea.  He was taking his Merchant Navy officer's ticket when the war broke out in 1914.

He and a friend joined a Scottish regiment "for a bit of fun" as the war was anticipated to be over by Christmas. He was commissioned in the Leicestershire Regiment in November 1914.

Bent was awarded the Distinguished Service Order in the 1917 Birthday Honours.

He was 26 years old, and a Temporary Lieutenant Colonel in the 9th Battalion, The Leicestershire Regiment, British Army during the First World War when he performed the deed for which he was awarded the VC on 1 October 1917 east of Polygon Wood, Zonnebeke, Belgium. He was killed whilst leading a charge. His citation reads:

He has no known grave and is commemorated on the memorial wall at Tyne Cot Cemetery, Belgium.
In 2015 a new road in Ashby de la Zouch was named "Philip Bent Road"; this is located approximately 0.6 miles west of the town centre off Moira Road (B5006).

Bent's sword is displayed in All Saints Cathedral in his hometown of Halifax.

The medal
His Victoria Cross is held by his old school Ashby School but loaned to the Royal Leicestershire Regimental Museum (now part of Newarke Houses Museum). The school proposed to auction his medals to raise funds for a sports pavilion, a decision which received widespread criticism. In May 2016 the school was unable to prove ownership. In 2018, a pavilion is set to be built following a funding bid to the Healthy Schools initiative.

See also 
Military history of Nova Scotia

References

Monuments to Courage (David Harvey, 1999)
The Register of the Victoria Cross (This England, 1997)
VCs of the First World War - Passchendaele 1917 (Stephen Snelling, 1998)

External links
 Service details, citation, burial information - from Veteran Affairs Canada
 Legion Magazine Article on Philip Bent

1891 births
1917 deaths
Royal Leicestershire Regiment officers
British Army personnel of World War I
Canadian sailors
Canadian people of British descent
Canadian World War I recipients of the Victoria Cross
Companions of the Distinguished Service Order
People from Halifax, Nova Scotia
People educated at the Royal High School, Edinburgh
British military personnel killed in World War I
British Army recipients of the Victoria Cross
Canadian military personnel from Nova Scotia